The logos and uniforms of the Los Angeles Lakers have gone through many changes throughout the history of the team.

Logos
The logos below are in chronological order.

Uniforms

Minneapolis era
As the Minneapolis Lakers, their road uniform is powder blue with gold trim. It is notable that it featured the city name's abbreviation (MPLS) on their road uniforms; they later changed it to the team nickname in block lettering. Their home uniform is white with powder blue and gold trim, and features the team nickname. It was used from 1948–58. The original MPLS uniforms were later used as throwback uniforms in the 2001–02 and 2017–18 seasons. The home white uniform from this era was brought back in the 2022–23 season in commemoration of the franchise's 75th anniversary.

In their final years in Minneapolis, the uniforms were tweaked, eliminating gold; the uniform featured four stars surrounding the front of the jersey. The shade of blue was changed to royal blue. During the 2004–05 season, the Lakers wore fauxback uniforms, featuring the uniform design worn in the final seasons in Minneapolis, but with the powder blue base of the George Mikan era.

Early Los Angeles era

Upon moving to Los Angeles in 1960, they retained the blue and white scheme. The uniforms now feature a cursive 'Los Angeles' lettering. The road uniforms were royal blue with white and powder blue trim, while the home uniforms were white with royal and powder blue trim. The shorts feature the wordmark 'Lakers' on either side of the leg. The uniforms were used as throwbacks in the 1996–97, 2003–04 and 2020–21 seasons.

Switch to purple and gold
In 1967, Jack Kent Cooke purchased the Lakers and moved to The Forum. Cooke made some drastic changes to the Lakers' look by outfitting them in purple (known as Forum blue until the early 1980s) and gold uniforms.

1967–78
The initial purple and gold look featured a slanted "Lakers" script and white numbers with either gold or purple drop shadows. With a few changes in the striping scheme, this look would be used by the Lakers until the 1977–78 season. 

The 1971–72 version of the gold uniforms were used as throwback uniforms in the 2010–11 season. However, this uniform featured sans-serif player names and a straight "Lakers" script, whereas the originals had serifed player names and a slanted "Lakers" script.

1978–99
The gold uniforms were overhauled prior to the 1978–79 season, switching from white numbers to purple numbers with white drop shadows. The new look was unveiled a year before Jerry Buss purchased the Lakers and Magic Johnson launched the Showtime era.

During the early 1980s, the Lakers wore mismatched shades of purple in their uniforms. On most occasions, the jersey was rendered in a darker shade whereas the shorts were lighter in hue and vice versa. This color issue was corrected later in the decade. Before the 1986-87 season, changes were made to the uniforms when the number font changed and decreased in size. The "Lakers" script also realigned into a straight arrangement.

The Lakers revived the "Showtime" gold uniforms as throwbacks during the 2007–08 and 2016–17 seasons. In a home game against the Boston Celtics on December 30, 2007, the Lakers wore short shorts to match their throwback uniforms in the first half before switching to the baggy-styled shorts in the second half.

1999–2018
Prior to the 1999–2000 season, the Lakers unveiled a new uniform set. The side stripes now extend towards the jersey, the drop shadows were removed, a modernized "Lakers" script was introduced, and white numbers returned to the gold uniform. 

At the time of its unveiling, Nike served as the Lakers' uniform provider along with several other teams. The enduring feature of this uniform was the "wishbone" collar, which was also adopted by the Dallas Mavericks, Detroit Pistons, Miami Heat and Toronto Raptors upon releasing their respective uniforms.

Alternate white uniform
In the 2002–03 season, the Lakers unveiled a white alternate uniform. The white jerseys were designed by Lakers owner Jerry Buss' daughter Jeanie Buss, in tribute to Chick Hearn, who was regarded as the voice of the team for forty years until his death in August 2002. 

Along with the unveiling of the white alternate uniform, the Lakers released a new alternate logo featuring the purple "L" outside a gold basketball. This logo was then placed on the purple and gold uniforms prior to the 2004–05 season. These jerseys are only played on Sunday games.

Hollywood Nights black uniform
From the 2013–14 to the 2016–17 seasons, the Lakers wore a black uniform that was inspired from the Hollywood night life. Dubbed "Hollywood Nights", the uniform was black with purple and gold trim. They debuted the uniform on the road against the Brooklyn Nets on November 27, 2013, and were used for select Friday home dates. A variation of the "Hollywood Nights" jerseys, featuring sleeves, was unveiled for the 2014–15 season.

Special uniforms
From the 2007–08 to the 2016–17 seasons, the Lakers wore special edition white uniforms for NBA's Noche Latina events. The uniforms were similar to the Sunday whites, but with the wordmark "Los Lakers". During the 2013–14 season, the Lakers wore a sleeved version of the Noche Latina uniforms, with "Los Lakers" in gold with purple trim, and greyscale patterns at the back.

The Lakers wore special Christmas-themed uniforms as part of the NBA's Christmas games from 2012 to 2016. They wore the following one-off Christmas uniforms:

2012: Monochrome white uniforms with lettering in white with purple trim.
2013: Sleeved white uniforms with primary logo in chrome with purple accents.
2014: Modified home white uniforms with "L" alternate logo, purple numbers and purple nameplates.
2015: Cream uniforms with ornate lettering and numbers.
2016: Monochrome white uniforms with ornate lettering and numbers.

Move to Nike
For the 2017–18 season, Nike took over the league's uniform contracts and the NBA did away with the "home" and "away" uniform designation. The Lakers white jersey became the team's "Association" jersey (named as such because every NBA team has a white jersey), the gold became the "Icon" jersey, and the purple became the "Statement" jersey that each team has.

In addition, Nike has a "City" uniform that pays tribute to each team's local culture and heritage. The Lakers' "City" uniforms are known as the "Lore Series" designed to honor its greatest players. In the 2017–18 season, their "City" uniform paid tribute to Kobe Bryant. The following season, the Lakers unveiled a new "Lore Series" uniform focusing on Magic Johnson. For the 2019–20 "Lore Series" uniform, the Lakers honored Shaquille O'Neal. For the 2020–21 "Lore Series" uniform, the Lakers looked back in the past and honored Elgin Baylor in their first years in Los Angeles before switching to purple and gold. 

In the 2021–22 season, the Lakers were one of 27 teams to wear "mix-tape" uniforms for the NBA's 75th anniversary special "City" series. This design featured a purple base, but with a few cues from past uniforms. The slanted "Lakers" wordmark and drop-shadowed numbers were taken from the 1967–86 uniforms, while powder blue trim and white stars represented the team's Minneapolis years. On the shorts, the full team name shaped into a triangle was a nod to the early 1960s logo, and the current "L" alternate logo on the waist was a nod to the Kobe Bryant era.

The Lakers' 2022–23 "City" uniform did not honor any past team legend. According to the team, it stated that "the uniform is not the story, it is a vehicle to tell the stories behind the individual Changemakers around Los Angeles". The blank canvas was represented by a white base, with the city name in purple along with black numbers and purple drop shadows.

Nike also releases an "Earned" uniform on occasion as a reward for making the NBA playoffs the previous season. The Lakers' 2020–21 version was similar to the "Hollywood Nights" alternates they wore from 2013 to 2017, though it was updated to the current Showtime-inspired design. They are also the only team whose "Earned" uniform featured a metallic gold Nike swoosh; this by virtue of winning the 2020 NBA Finals.

2018–present
Just before the 2018–19 season, the Lakers updated and unveiled their new uniforms. The side stripes were removed from the gold "Icon" and white "Association" uniform (the shorts retain this feature), while black side stripes with gold and white trim flank the purple "Statement" uniform. 

In addition, drop shadows return to the uniform numbers for the first time since 1999. And in another first for the franchise, the Lakers will feature gold numbers with white drop shadows on the purple uniform, while the gold uniforms will return to purple numbers with white drop shadows.

Prior to the 2022–23 season, the Lakers made subtle changes to the purple "Statement" uniform. The uniform number was changed to black with gold side stripes, while adding black shoulder stripes and trim.

Notable uniform moments
Even though the Lakers have traditionally worn purple on the road, gold at home and more recently white on Sunday home games, there have been a few instances where the Lakers eschewed tradition.

During the 2007–08 season, the Lakers wore their classic gold uniforms for two away games: December 21 against the Philadelphia 76ers, and December 23 against the New York Knicks. The home team wore their white throwback uniforms. Similarly, they wore their 1971–72 gold uniforms for three away games: February 10, 2011 against the Celtics, February 11 against the Knicks, and February 13 against the Orlando Magic. With the exception of the Magic, the Lakers' opponents wore throwback uniforms for the occasion.

In recent years, the Lakers occasionally broke out their gold uniforms for a few away contests against teams that wore their dark primary, alternate or throwback uniforms. But after Nike became the league's outfitter for 2017 and beyond, the Lakers were forced to use only their gold "Icon" and white "Association" uniforms on either home or away games for the first two months of the season, after which the purple "Statement" uniforms were added to the rotation. 

In another break from tradition, the Lakers wore their purple "Statement" uniforms for the first time in a home game on November 29, 2017 against the Golden State Warriors.

Halfway through the 2019-20 NBA season, Kobe Bryant, was one of the victims of the 2020 Calabasas helicopter crash along with his 13-year-old daughter Gianna, six other passengers, and the pilot. In honor of his legacy, a patch of his initials was placed above the Nike swoosh logo. Also, the patch is placed on the back ends of the Lakers' homecourt, and Kobe’s numbers on the sidelines, with his #8 near the Lakers bench, and his #24 near the visiting team‘s bench. Upon entering the 2020 NBA playoffs, the Lakers decided to wear "Black Mamba" jerseys that had used in 2017-18 Los Angeles Lakers season, first used in Game 4 of the First Round against Portland Trail Blazers, which is exactly one day after Kobe's birthday.  The team also announced that if the Lakers will advance to the next round, it will be included to the team's jersey rotation.  The jersey included the number 2 jersey of Kobe's daughter Gianna above the Nike swoosh in a white heart shape.

References

Los Angeles Lakers